Putley is a village and civil parish  east of Hereford, in the county of Herefordshire, England. In 2011 the parish had a population of 245. The parish borders Aylton, Woolhope, Pixley, Much Marcle and Tarrington.

Features 
There are 49 listed buildings in Putley. Putley has a parish hall and a church. Putley also possibly had a castle called Putley Castle.

History 
The name "Putley" means 'Putta's wood/clearing' or 'hawk wood/clearing'. Putley was recorded in the Domesday Book as Poteslepe. Pulley is also recorded as a name for "Putley". On the 25th of March 1885 two cottages at Mainswood Houses, a part of Ashperton parish, Bull's Grove and Hazle Farms Houses, a part of Munsley parish and Hatsford, &c Houses, a part of Woolhope parish was transferred to the parish, a part near Beans Bulls was transferred to Woolhope parish.

References

External links 
 
 

Villages in Herefordshire
Civil parishes in Herefordshire